Lucas Oil Late Model Dirt Series is a dirt late model touring series owned and operated by Lucas Oil. The series competes on dirt ovals across the United States, primarily throughout the east coast and the midwest. The cars feature a purpose-built chassis design specifically for dirt late model racing. With many chassis builders within the sport, chassis design and components are always on the cutting edge of innovation and technology. The cars are powered by aluminum-head V8 engines (usually ranging between 400c.i. and 430c.i.) that produce over 800 horsepower.

Among the marquee races on the Lucas Oil Late Model Dirt Series schedule include Winternationals at East Bay Raceway Park, Show-Me 100 at Lucas Oil Speedway, Silver Dollar Nationals at I-80 Speedway, Topless 100 at Batesville Motor Speedway, Knoxville Late Model Nationals at Knoxville Raceway, the Pittsburgher 100 at Pittsburgh's PA Motor Speedway, and the Dirt Track World Championship at Portsmouth Raceway Park.

Television

The series is currently broadcast on MavTV, CBS, CBS Sports Network and NBCSN. For 2018, the Show-Me 100 will be broadcast live on MavTV while the rest of the races broadcast will be on delay. LucasOilRacing.TV and Dirt on DIRT also provide live video broadcasts online of select races. 
 For the final race of 2014, Discovery Canada taped a documentary featuring the top three drivers (Don O'Neal, Jimmy Owens, and Scott Bloomquist. Also in 2014, the series had a mini-series of fifteen televised races and the winner received a $10,000 bonus.

Past champion

 2022 - Tim McCreadie, Watertown, NY

2021 – Tim McCreadie, Watertown, NY
2020 – Jimmy Owens, Newport, TN
2019 – Jonathan Davenport, Blairsville, GA
2018 – Jonathan Davenport, Blairsville, GA
2017 – Josh Richards, Shinnston, WV
2016 – Scott Bloomquist, Mooresburg, TN
2015 – Jonathan Davenport, Blairsville, GA
2014 – Don O'Neal, Martinsville, IN
2013 – Jimmy Owens, Newport, TN
2012 – Jimmy Owens, Newport, TN
2011 – Jimmy Owens, Newport, TN
2010 – Scott Bloomquist, Mooresburg, TN
2009 – Scott Bloomquist, Mooresburg, TN
2008 – Earl Pearson Jr., Jacksonville, FL
2007 – Earl Pearson Jr., Jacksonville, FL
2006 – Earl Pearson Jr., Jacksonville, FL
2005 – Earl Pearson Jr., Jacksonville, FL

References

External links

Official website

Stock car racing series in the United States
Dirt track racing in the United States
Late Model Dirt Series